Broad Branch is an unincorporated community in Calhoun County, Florida, United States. The community is located at the west end of County Road 392, and is named for a tributary to Cypress Creek.

Unincorporated communities in Calhoun County, Florida
Unincorporated communities in Florida